Eitan Tchernov (1935 – December 13, 2002) was an author and professor of biology at the Hebrew University of Jerusalem. Tchernov was born in Tel Aviv, Israel and received a PhD from the Hebrew University of Jerusalem in 1966. He chaired the Center for the Study & Management of the Environment in 1980 and the High Professional Committee of the Authority of Nature Reserves from 1979 to 1982.

In 1991 he founded the Department of Evolution, Systematics and Ecology at the Hebrew University of Jerusalem, serving as its first chairman. He was also involved in establishing the Israel Nature Reserves Authority, serving as its first ranger and later as a member of its scientific advisory board. He likewise served on the board of the Society for the Protection of Nature and on other nature conservation boards including the UNESCO-MAB committee (Man and the Biosphere) and SCOPE (Scientific Committee on Problems of the Environment). He was co-editor of the Hebrew environmental magazine Sevivot from 1986 to 2002.

Legacy
Eitan Tchernov is commemorated in the scientific name of a species of snake, Micrelaps tchernovi.

Books
An Early Neolithic Village in the Jordan Valley, Part II: The Fauna of Netiv Hagdud, 2004
Structure, Function and Evolution of Teeth, 1992

References

Israeli conservationists
Israeli paleontologists
20th-century Israeli zoologists
Paleozoologists
1935 births
2002 deaths
Hebrew University of Jerusalem alumni
Academic staff of the Hebrew University of Jerusalem
People from Tel Aviv
Israeli archaeologists
Zooarchaeologists
20th-century archaeologists